Georgi Stefanov (Bulgarian: Георги Стефанов; born 13 July 1988, in Plovdiv) is a Bulgarian footballer who plays as a forward for Oborishte.

Career
In August 2017, Stefanov joined Arda Kardzhali.  He was released at the end of the season.

In July 2018, Stefanov returned to Oborishte.

References

External links

1986 births
Living people
Footballers from Plovdiv
Bulgarian footballers
First Professional Football League (Bulgaria) players
Second Professional Football League (Bulgaria) players
PFC Litex Lovech players
PFC Spartak Pleven players
PFC Belite Orli Pleven players
FC Maritsa Plovdiv players
Botev Plovdiv players
PFC Lokomotiv Plovdiv players
FC Lyubimets players
FC Vereya players
FC Spartak Plovdiv players
FC Levski Karlovo players
FC Oborishte players
FC Arda Kardzhali players
Association football forwards